The Women's field hockey at the 2009 Australian Youth Olympic Festival was the second edition of the field hockey tournament for women at the AYOF.

Great Britain won the tournament for the second time by defeating Australia 3–2 in the final. India won the bronze medal by defeating the United States 2–0 in the third and fourth place playoff.

Competition format
The tournament featured the national under–21 teams of Great Britain, India, Malaysia, and the hosts, Australia, competing in a round-robin format, with each team playing each other once. Three points were awarded for a win, one for a draw, and none for a loss.

At the conclusion of the pool stage, the top two teams contested the final, while the bottom two teams played off for third place.

Teams
The following four teams competed for the title:

Officials
The following umpires were appointed by the International Hockey Federation to officiate the tournament:

 Leah Ashford (AUS)
 Lynn Norhana Hassan (SGP)
 Stephanie Judefind (USA)
 Anupama Puchimanda (IND)
 Hannah Sanders (GBR)

Results

Preliminary round

Pool

Fixtures

Classification round

Third and fourth place

Final

Statistics

Final standings

Goalscorers

References

External links

Field hockey at the Australian Youth Olympic Festival
International women's field hockey competitions hosted by Australia
2009 in women's field hockey
2009 in Australian women's field hockey